The Commonwealth Parliament Offices, Sydney in Sydney, Australia are located at levels 19-21, 1 Bligh Street, Sydney. They serve as a venue for the Cabinet to meet whilst in Sydney.

The former Commonwealth Parliament Offices in Sydney were located at Charterbridge House, 56-70 Phillip Street, Sydney, only one block from Circular Quay and across the road from the Museum of Sydney which is the site of the first Government House in Sydney. They were host to various international leaders During APEC Australia 2007 in September 2007, with visiting heads of state including President of the United States George W. Bush, President of the Russian Federation Vladimir Putin, President of the People's Republic of China Hu Jintao and the Prime Minister of Japan Shinzō Abe. The Sydney Office of the Prime Minister of Australia John Howard was situated on the 9th floor of the building.

References

External links

Buildings of the Australian government
Government buildings in Australia
Government of Australia
Government buildings in Sydney